Julien Ringel was a French cinematographer of the silent and early sound eras.

Selected filmography
 Face à l'Océan (1920)
 La folie du doute (1920)
 The Blaireau Case (1923)
 La gitanilla (1924)
 My Uncle Benjamin (1924)
 Princess Masha (1927)
 Prince Jean (1928)
 Nicole and Her Virtue (1932)
 Love and Luck (1932)

References

Bibliography
 Powrie, Phil & Rebillard, Éric. Pierre Batcheff and stardom in 1920s French cinema. Edinburgh University Press, 2009.

External links

Year of birth unknown
Year of death unknown
French cinematographers